The Futsal Confederations Cup is a futsal tournament for national teams. It is contested by the winners of each of the six FIFA confederation championships (AFC, CAF, CONCACAF, CONMEBOL, UEFA, OFC), the winner of the FIFA Futsal World Cup and the host country.

Results

 A round-robin tournament determined the final standings.

Ranking

* = hosts

Comprehensive team results by tournament
 Legend

Overall team records
In this ranking 3 points are awarded for a win, 1 for a draw and 0 for a loss. As per statistical convention in football, matches decided in extra time are counted as wins and losses, while matches decided by penalty shoot-outs are counted as draws.  Teams are ranked by total points, then by goal difference, then by goals scored.

See also
FIFA Futsal World Cup

References

 
International futsal competitions